Kim Ji-su (born 12 December 2000) is a South Korean judoka.

She participated at the 2018 World Judo Championships, winning a medal. In 2021, she won the silver medal in her event at the 2021 Asian-Pacific Judo Championships held in Bishkek, Kyrgyzstan.

She competed in the women's 57 kg event at the 2020 Summer Olympics held in Tokyo, Japan.

References

External links
 

2000 births
Living people
South Korean female judoka
Judoka at the 2020 Summer Olympics
Olympic judoka of South Korea
Universiade medalists in judo
Universiade bronze medalists for South Korea
Medalists at the 2019 Summer Universiade
21st-century South Korean women